George Corson (1829–1910) was a Scottish architect active in Leeds, West Yorkshire, England.

Background
He was born in Dumfries, where he was articled to Walter Newall before moving to Leeds in 1849 to work with his brother William Reid Corson who was working there with Edward La Trobe Bateman.  His brother left Leeds in 1860, leaving Corson in charge of the practice.

In Leeds he was president of the Leeds and Yorkshire Architectural Association by 1898.

Works
Corson was responsible for many buildings in Leeds including:
 the Grand Theatre (1877–78), with his assistant James Robinson Watson - Grade II* listed
 the municipal buildings (1878–84) - Grade II* listed, now housing the Leeds Central Library.
 an extension (1891–92) to George Gilbert Scott's Grade I listed Leeds General Infirmary
 Apsley House (formerly Concourse House) (1903) - originally a drapers and haberdashery warehouse for Crowe & Co and now occupied by Sky Sports
 many large houses in Headingley including the Grade II* listed Spenfield
 St Edmund's Church, Roundhay, Leeds, designed 1873.
 Bewerley Street School, Bewerley Street, Dewsbury Road, Leeds, designed 1872.
 St Silas National School, Goodman Street, Hunslet, designed 1872.
 Additions and alterations to Ripon Grammar School, designed 1875.
 Leeds School of Medicine, Park Street, inaugurated 1865.
 the  warehouse (1859) at the textile manufacturing premises   of Francis  Lupton in Wellington  Street  Leeds,  the  plans  (June 1870) for the  Lupton family's    Newton  Hall/Newton  Park  Estate in Potternewton,   and the  1860 Victorian wing of the  Lupton family's  Beechwood  Estate,  Roundhay; known  as  Corson  House.

Roundhay Park and Lawnswood Cemetery
Corson won a competition for the landscaping of Roundhay Park in 1873, and in 1874 designed the layout and many of the buildings of Lawnswood cemetery, where he himself was buried in 1910. His gravestone, a celtic cross with five bosses, is grade II listed, one of only four listed memorials at Lawnswood.

References

External links

 Scottish Architects: George Corson Biography and career

19th-century Scottish architects
People from Dumfries
1829 births
1910 deaths
Leeds Blue Plaques